Ronald James Deibert  (born 1964) is a Canadian professor of political science, philosopher, founder and director of the Citizen Lab at the Munk School of Global Affairs, University of Toronto.

He is a co-founder and a principal investigator of the OpenNet Initiative and Information Warfare Monitor projects. Deibert was one of the founders and former VP of global policy and outreach for Psiphon.

Citizen Lab

As founder and director of the Citizen Lab, Deibert has overseen and been a contributing author to more than 120 reports covering  research on cyber espionage, commercial spyware, Internet censorship, and human rights.

Massey Lectures
In 2020, he gave the annual Massey Lectures for the Canadian Broadcasting Corporation, and they were published in book form under the title Reset: Reclaiming the Internet for Civil Society. The book won the 2021 Shaughnessy Cohen Prize for Political Writing.

Other Work 
Deibert presently serves on the editorial boards of the journals International Political Sociology, Explorations in Media Ecology, Review of Policy Research, Journal of Global Security Studies, and Astropolitics. He has served on the advisory boards of Access Now, Privacy International, the technical advisory groups of Amnesty International and Human Rights Watch, and is currently on the advisory boards of PEN Canada and the Design 4 Democracy Coalition, the steering committee of the World Movement for Democracy, the advisory board for the Citizen Clinic at the University of California, Berkeley, and co-chair of the University of Toronto's Information Security Council.

Awards
In recognition of his own work or that of the Citizen Lab, Deibert has been awarded the University of Toronto's President's Impact Award (2017), Foreign Policy'''s Global Thinker Award (2017), the Electronic Frontier Foundation Pioneer award (2015), the Neil Postman Award for Career Achievement in Public Intellectual Activity (2014), the Advancement of Intellectual Freedom in Canada Award from the Canadian Library Association (2014), the Canadian Journalists for Free Expression Vox Libera Award (2010), the Carolyn Tuohy Award for Public Policy (2010), the Northrop Frye Distinguished Teaching and Research Award (2003), and the University of Toronto Outstanding Teaching Award (2002). He was a Ford Foundation research scholar of information and communication technologies (2002–2004). In 2019, he received an honorary Doctor of Laws from the University of Guelph.

He was named a Global Thinker by Foreign Policy (2017), one of Motherboard website's "Humans of the Year" (2017), listed among SC Magazine's top "IT Security Luminaries" (2010), and Esquire magazine's Best and Brightest List of 2007.

In 2013, he was made a Member of the Order of Ontario and awarded the Queen Elizabeth II Diamond Jubilee Medal, for being "among the first to recognize and take measures to mitigate growing threats to communications rights, openness and security worldwide." He was appointed to the Order of Canada in 2022, with the rank of Officer.Reset: Reclaiming the Internet for Civil Society won the 2021 Shaughnessy Cohen Prize for Political Writing.

Publications
Co-edited by DeibertAccess Denied: The practice and policy of Internet Filtering (MIT Press, 2008)Access Controlled: The shaping of power, rights, and rule in cyberspace (MIT Press, 2010)Access Contested: Security, Identity, and Resistance in Asian Cyberspace (MIT Press, 2011)

Authored by DeibertParchment, Printing, and Hypermedia: Communications in World Order Transformation (New York: Columbia University Press, 1997)Black Code: Surveillance, Privacy, and the Dark Side of the Internet (Penguin Random House, 2013). Turned into a feature-length documentary Black Code by Nicholas de Pencier in 2016.Reset: Reclaiming the Internet for Civil Society'' (September, 2020) – Massey Lectures

References

External links

 Academic website

1964 births
Living people
Members of the Order of Ontario
Writers from Toronto
Academic staff of the University of Toronto
University of British Columbia alumni
Canadian political scientists
Canadian male non-fiction writers
21st-century Canadian non-fiction writers
21st-century Canadian male writers
Officers of the Order of Canada